Angarano may refer to: 

Michael Angarano (born 1987), American actor
Villa Angarano, a villa in Bassano del Grappa, Veneto, northern Italy